The 1938 Fordham Rams football team represented Fordham University during the 1938 college football season.

Schedule

References

Fordham
Fordham Rams football seasons
Fordham Rams football